Ostrá is a municipality and village in Nymburk District in the Central Bohemian Region of the Czech Republic. It has about 600 inhabitants.

Administrative parts
The village of Šnepov is an administrative part of Ostrá.

References

Villages in Nymburk District